The Cichlasomatinae are a subfamily of cichlid fishes, including all cichlids native to the Greater Antilles (Cuba and Hispaniola), United States (southern Texas), Mexico and Central America, and many of the cichlids from South America (the other South American subfamilies are Astronotinae, Cichlinae, Geophaginae, and Retroculinae). The subfamily Cichlasomatinae is often divided into two tribes: Cichlasomatini and Heroini, however some authorities classify these two tribes as part of the wider Neotropical and marginally Nearctic subfamily Cichlinae.

Genera
This subfamily contains about 56 genera and 260 species:
 Tribe Cichlasomatini Swainson, 1839
 Acaronia Myers, 1940
 Aequidens C. H. Eigenmann & W. L. Bray, 1894
 Andinoacara Musilová, Říčan & Novák, 2009
 Bujurquina Kullander, 1986
 Cichlasoma Swainson, 1839
 Cleithracara  Kullander & Nijssen 1989
 Ivanacara Römer & Hahn, 2006
 Krobia S. O. Kullander & Nijssen, 1989
 Laetacara Kullander, 1986
 Nannacara Regan, 1905
 Rondonacara Ottoni & Mattos, 2015
 Tahuantinsuyoa Kullander, 1986
 Tribe Heroini Kullander, 1998
 Amatitlania Schmitter-Soto, 2007
 Amphilophus Agassiz, 1859
 Archocentrus T.N. Gill, 1877
 Astatheros Pellegrin, 1904
 Australoheros Říčan & Kullander, 2006
 Caquetaia Fowler, 1945
 Chiapaheros McMahan & Piller, 2015 
 Chocoheros Říčan & Piálek, 2016
 Chortiheros Říčan & Piálek, 2016
 Cincelichthys McMahan & Piller, 2015
 Cryptoheros Allgayer, 2001
 Darienheros Říčan & Novák 2016
 Herichthys Baird & Girard, 1854
 Heroina Kullander, 1996
 Heros Heckel, 1840
 Herotilapia Pellegrin, 1904
 Hoplarchus Kaup, 1860
 Hypselecara Kullander, 1986
 Hypsophrys Agassiz, 1859
 Isthmoheros (Meek & Hildebrand, 1913) 
 Kihnichthys McMahan & Matamoros, 2015
 Kronoheros Říčan & Piálek, 2016
 Maskaheros McMahan & Piller, 2015
 Mayaheros Říčan & Piálek, 2016
 Mesoheros McMahan & Chakrabarty, 2015
 Mesonauta Günther, 1867
 Nandopsis T.N. Gill, 1862
 Nosferatu De la Maza-Benignos, Ornelas-García, Lozano-Vilano, García-Ramírez & Doadrio, 2015
 Oscura McMahan & Chakrabarty, 2015
 Parachromis Agassiz, 1859
 Paraneetroplus Regan, 1905
 Petenia Günther, 1862
 Pterophyllum Heckel, 1840
 Rheoheros McMahan & Matamoros, 2015
 Rocio Schmitter-Soto, 2007
 Symphysodon Heckel, 1840
 Theraps Günther, 1862
 Thorichthys Meek, 1904
 Tomocichla Regan, 1908
 Trichromis McMahan & Chakrabarty, 2015
 Uaru Heckel, 1840
 Vieja Fernández-Yépez, 1969
 Wajpamheros Říčan & Piálek, 2016

References

 
Cichlid fish of Central America
Cichlid fish of South America
Fish subfamilies
Taxa named by Sven O. Kullander